Vladimir Buač (Serbian Cyrillic: Владимир Буач; born 26 December 1984) is a Croatian Serb former professional footballer who played as a forward, and the current football coach.

Career
Buač is best remembered for his time at Vojvodina, making over 100 official appearances for the side. He subsequently moved abroad to France and signed with Ligue 2 side Nîmes in 2009. In the following years, Buač also played in the top flights of Kazakhstan, Hungary, and Albania.

After retiring from the game, Buač served as both assistant and caretaker manager at his former club Vojvodina. He again took charge of Vojvodina in September 2017.

Honours
Vojvodina
 Serbian Cup: Runner-up 2006–07

References

External links

Kategoria Superiore players
Association football forwards
Egri FC players
Expatriate footballers in Albania
Expatriate footballers in France
Expatriate footballers in Hungary
Expatriate footballers in Kazakhstan
FC Atyrau players
First League of Serbia and Montenegro players
FK BSK Borča players
FK Cement Beočin players
FK Kabel players
FK Partizani Tirana players
FK Vojvodina managers
FK Vojvodina players
Kazakhstan Premier League players
Ligue 2 players
Nemzeti Bajnokság I players
Nîmes Olympique players
Sportspeople from Knin
Serbian expatriate footballers
Serbian expatriate sportspeople in Albania
Serbian expatriate sportspeople in France
Serbian expatriate sportspeople in Hungary
Serbian expatriate sportspeople in Kazakhstan
Serbian football managers
Serbian footballers
Serbian SuperLiga managers
FK Spartak Subotica managers
Serbian SuperLiga players
Serbs of Croatia
Yugoslav Wars refugees
Refugees in Serbia
1984 births
Living people